Mohammad Amin Hazbavi (born May 6, 2003) is an Iranian football defender who currently plays for Foolad in the Persian Gulf Pro League.

Club career

Foolad
He made his debut for Foolad in the 12th fixtures of 2021–22 Persian Gulf Pro League against Esteghlal while he substituted in for Ayanda Patosi.

References

Living people
2003 births
People from Ahvaz
Association football defenders
Iranian footballers
Foolad FC players
Persian Gulf Pro League players
Sportspeople from Khuzestan province